Muhammad Taqi Amīni ( 5 May 1926 – 21 January 1991) was an Indian Sunni Islamic scholar, jurist, Urdu author and the dean of Theology faculty of Aligarh Muslim University.  He is known for his works on Islamic jurisprudence, and his book Fiqh Islami ka Tareekhi Pas-e-Manzar is a required reading for master's degree in Islamic studies at the Islamic University of Science & Technology.

Amīni was an alumnus of the Jami’ul Ulum, Kanpur and the Madrasa Aminia. During his career, he taught at Darul Uloom Nadwatul Ulama and served as the Principal at Darul Uloom Muiniya in Ajmer. He became a Dean Professor in the Theology faculty at Aligarh Muslim University and retired in 1986. He wrote books including Reconstruction of Culture and Islam, Ijtehad Ka Tareekhi Pas-e-Manzar and Ahkam-e-Sharia Mai Halat-o-Zamana Ki Ri'ayat.

Biography
Muhammad Taqi Amīni was born on 5 May 1926 in Subeha, Barabanki, United Provinces of British India (now Uttar Pradesh). He acquired his primary education in local madrassas and then went to Jami’ul Ulum in Kanpur. He completed his dars-e-nizami studies under Kifayatullah Dihlawi at Madrasa Aminia in Delhi.

Amīni started teaching at Madrasa Subhania Delhi, Darul Uloom Nadwatul Ulama and Jami'ul-Uloom in Kanpur. He moved to Nagpur in 1950, where he taught in Madrasa Sanwiya and High School for about 6 years and then moved to Ajmer in 1956 to teach at Darul Uloom Muinia where he became Principal and Shaykh al-Hadith. His career in Darul Uloom Muinia lasted for about seven years and he mainly taught Hadith sciences. At the request of Saeed Ahmad Akbarabadi, Amīni joined Aligarh Muslim University (AMU) as a lecturer in the department of Sunni Theology in 1964. He became a professor and department head, then the Dean of the Faculty of Theology, and stayed at the AMU until 1986. However, the Vice Chancellor of the AMU, Sayyid Hashim Ali extended his post up to 1989.<ref name="asir" /  Amīni was a member of Majlis Tahqeeqat-e-Shariah, a jurisprudence council established by Abul Hasan Ali Nadwi. Amīni died on 21 January 1991 in Aligarh.

At the AMU, Javed Ahsan Falahi wrote a doctoral thesis entitled Mawlana Muhammad Taqi Amīni: Life and Contributions.

Understanding of punishment
In Punishment of Apostasy in Islam, S. A. Rahman says that, according to Amini,

Literary works
Amīni's books include:
Ahkam-e-Sharia Mai Halat-o-Zamana Ki Ri'ayat
Fiqh-e-Islami Ka Tareekhi Pas-e-Manzar
Hadees Ka Dirayati Meyar
Hikmatul Quran
Ijtehad Ka Tareekhi Pas-e-Manzar
Islam Ka Zar'i Nizam
Ka’inat mai Insan ka Maqam
La-mazhabi Daur Ka Tareekhi Pas-e-Manzar
Muraslat: Ilmi wa Deeni
Tahzib-e-Jadīd ki Tashkīl

References

Bibliography
 
 
 
 

1926 births
1991 deaths
Deobandis
Indian Sunni Muslim scholars of Islam
Urdu-language writers from India
Indian jurists
Academic staff of Aligarh Muslim University
Madrasa Aminia alumni
People from Barabanki district